The 2012 Men's Oceania Handball Challenge Trophy was held in Apia, Samoa between October 1 and 6, 2012.

The competition participants were defending champions Australia, New Zealand, Vanuatu and Cook Islands and hosts Samoa.

The winners were Australia, going through undefeated. Second was New Zealand then Vanuatu, Cook Islands and Samoa.

Men's results

Group stage

Final

Rankings

References

 Result archive
 2012 report on NSWHF webpage

Oceania Handball Challenge Trophy
Oceania Handball Challenge Trophy
Handball in Samoa
2012 in Samoan sport
International sports competitions hosted by Samoa